The Frederick W. Stein House is a historic house in Atchison, Kansas. It was built in 1948 for Frederick W. Stein, the founder and president of the Steinlite Corporation, and his wife, née Helen Moore. Stein's company sold the Steinlite Moisture Tester. By the late 1940s, Stein served as Atchison's mayor.

The house was designed by George J. Davidson and G. Alden Krider in the Classical Revival architectural style. It has been listed on the National Register of Historic Places since January 14, 2004.

References

Houses on the National Register of Historic Places in Kansas
National Register of Historic Places in Atchison County, Kansas
Neoclassical architecture in Kansas
Houses completed in 1948